Murree Tehsil is one of the two Tehsils (i.e. sub-divisions) of Murree District in the Punjab province of Pakistan.

Murree Tehsil is located in the northernmost part of Punjab province where it borders Khyber Pakhtunkhwa. The hill resort city of Murree is the capital city of this area.

Administration

Murree Tehsil is divided into 15 Union Councils. These are:

Note: The UC prefix is used for administration purposes as Rawalpindi District has a total of 90 Union Councils.

2005 earthquake
During the earthquake of 2005, 40% of houses in Murree tehsil were damaged or destroyed.

Demographics 

According to population census of 2017 Murree has a population of 233,017.

References

Murree District
Tehsils of Punjab, Pakistan